The Washburn Public Library is a Carnegie library in Washburn, Wisconsin, United States. The library was built in 1904; it was the first permanent home for Washburn's library program, which began in 1891 and had previously operated out of City Hall. Architect Henry Wildhagen designed the building in the Neoclassical style. The library's front entrance is located in a portico with Ionic columns. Three windows with a joined sill are located on each side of the entrance, and chimneys on either end add to the building's symmetrical appearance. The building was built with local brownstone. The library is still in operation.

The library was added to the National Register of Historic Places on March 1, 1984.

References

External links
Washburn Public Library

Library buildings completed in 1904
Buildings and structures in Bayfield County, Wisconsin
Neoclassical architecture in Wisconsin
Education in Bayfield County, Wisconsin
Libraries on the National Register of Historic Places in Wisconsin
Carnegie libraries in Wisconsin
National Register of Historic Places in Bayfield County, Wisconsin